The Judo event at the 2022 European Youth Summer Olympic Festival was held at the Sports Park Judo arena in Banská Bystrica, Slovakia, from 26 to 30 July 2022. An NOC may be represented by up to 12 athletes, given that no more than 1 of them participates in any weight class. The final day of competition featured a mixed team event.

Schedule & event videos
The event aired on the EJU YouTube channel. All times are local (UTC+2).

Medal summary

Boys

Girls

Source Results

Mixed Team

Source Results

Medal table

References

External links
 
 Results book (archived)

2022 European Youth Summer Olympic Festival
European Youth Summer Olympic Festival
2022
2022 European Youth